The 9th Lambda Literary Awards were held in 1997 to honour works of LGBT literature published in 1996.

Special awards

Nominees and winners

External links
 9th Lambda Literary Awards

09
Lambda
Lists of LGBT-related award winners and nominees
1997 in LGBT history
1997 awards in the United States